Aqa Baba Sank (also Romanized as Āqā Bābā Sank; also known as Āqā Bābā Sang and Āqā Bābāy Sang) is a village in Ozomdel-e Shomali Rural District, in the Central District of Varzaqan County, East Azerbaijan Province, Iran. At the 2006 census, its population was 487, in 103 families.

References 

Towns and villages in Varzaqan County